Smuda is a surname. Notable people with this surname include:

 Franciszek Smuda (born 1948), Polish football coach
 Karl-Heinz Smuda (born 1961), German writer
 Sigrid Smuda (born 1960), German speed skater

See also
 
 Zmuda (surname)

Surnames of Slavic origin